Victoria Day (born 1972), is a female former international athlete who competed for England.

Athletics career
She represented England and won a silver medal in the 4 x 400 metres relay event, at the 1998 Commonwealth Games in Kuala Lumpur, Malaysia. The other team members consisted of Donna Fraser, Michelle Pierre and Michelle Thomas.

References

1972 births
Living people
English female sprinters
Commonwealth Games medallists in athletics
Commonwealth Games silver medallists for England
Athletes (track and field) at the 1998 Commonwealth Games
Medallists at the 1998 Commonwealth Games